Plectromerus distinctus is a species of beetle in the family Cerambycidae. It was described by Cameron in 1910. It is more well known as a longhorned beetle, and is used to compare invasive species of beetles to native species of beetles, especially in North America.

References

Cerambycinae
Beetles described in 1910